Ice Chips is The Skating Club of Boston's annual figure skating show held in Boston, Massachusetts. Originating in 1912, Ice Chips is said to be the longest running club-produced ice show in the world. The show is a two-day event which takes place each spring, showcasing national, international and Olympic champions from around the world. In recent years the show has been held at Harvard University, attracting thousands of spectators each year.

History

Originally referred to as an ice carnival, Ice Chips developed many of the techniques used in professional ice shows today.  In the 1920s and 1930s, the ice carnival served as a touring show, showcasing the club's premiere skaters on the East Coast. Revenue from these early shows funded the building of The Skating Club of Boston's current facility on Soldiers Field Road in 1938. Over the years, Ice Chips has showcased some of the greatest skaters in figure skating history. In the early years, Olympic champions Gillis Grafström, Sonja Henie, Karl Schäfer, Andrée Brunet, Pierre Brunet, Maxi Herber and Ernst Baier, and World champions, Cecilia Colledge and Felix Kaspar.  

In 1946, the show adopted the name Ice Chips, and went on to feature many more major champions including Dick Button, Barbara Ann Scott, Tenley Albright, Hayes Jenkins, Carol Heiss, Sjoukje Dijkstra, Donald Jackson, Barbara Wagner, Robert Paul, Peggy Fleming, Dorothy Hamill, Charles Tickner, Elaine Zayak, Scott Hamilton, Brian Boitano, Kurt Browning, Yuka Sato, Frances Dafoe, Norris Bowden, Tai Babilonia and Randy Gardner, Alexei Yagudin, Stephane Lambiel, Jeffrey Buttle and Kaetlyn Osmond. 

Preceding its 7-year run at Harvard University's Bright Arena, Ice Chips has been held in some of Boston's most historic venues, including the original Boston Garden, Northeastern University's Matthews Arena, and Boston University's Walter Brown Arena. In recent years, while at Harvard University, the show has featured Olympic medalists, Xue Shen and Hongbo Zhao, Meryl Davis and Charlie White, Evan Lysacek, and Javier Fernandez.

100th Anniversary
The 2012 production titled "Ice Chips of 2012 - 100 Years of Excellence" marked the 100th anniversary of Ice Chips and showcased over 400 skaters, including singles, pairs, ice dance, synchronized skating and theatre on ice teams. Some of the top performers in the production included Ross Miner, Marissa Castelli and Simon Shnapir, Gretchen Donlan and Andrew Speroff and guest stars Evan Lysacek and Mirai Nagasu.

Notable Performers

A partial list of notable skaters who have performed in Ice Chips include:

 Theresa Weld Blanchard and Nathaniel Niles
 Beatrix Loughran and Sherwin Badger
 Joan Tozzer and Bernard Fox
 Roger F. Turner
 Maribel Vinson
 Gretchen Merrill
 Dick Button
 Tenley Albright
 Laurence Owen
 Maribel Owen and Dudley Richards
 Bradley Lord
 Lorraine Hanlon
 Albertina Noyes
 John Misha Petkevich
 Suna Murray
 Paul Wylie
 Mark Mitchell
 Alexei Yagudin
 Jennifer Kirk
 Sasha Cohen
 Stephen Carriere
 Emily Hughes
 Ryan Bradley
 Ross Miner
 Meryl Davis and Charlie White
 Xue Shen and Hongbo Zhao
 Mirai Nagasu
 Evan Lysacek
 Gracie Gold
 Jason Brown
 Javier Fernandez

Beneficiaries
Ice Chips has donated revenues from the shows to various charities over the last 80 years. In recent years, Ice Chips has generated donations close to $100,000 for the Division of Sports Medicine at Children's Hospital Boston, Girl Scouts of Eastern Massachusetts, and Make-a-Wish Foundation.

References

External links

 Ice Chips Official Web Site
 The Skating Club of Boston's Official Web Site

1912 establishments in Massachusetts
Annual events in Boston
Figure skating in the United States
Ice shows
Recurring events established in 1912
Entertainment events in Boston
Performing arts in Massachusetts